Aloha is an unincorporated community in Grays Harbor County, in the U.S. state of Washington. It is located two miles east of the Pacific Ocean at Beaver Creek in west central Grays Harbor County.

History
The community was named after the Hawaiian-language word aloha. The name may have been inspired by the song "Aloha ʻOe".

Aloha was once home to Aloha Mill & Lumber Company. It was founded by R. D. Emerson and W. H. Dole in 1905. The name, a Hawaiian greeting, was chosen by members of the Dole family, who were landowners and business people in Hawaii. In 1920, Aloha Mill & Lumber Co. successfully bid on a unit of timber near Moclips, six miles away from its mill. For the next two years the company toiled at constructing a railroad to the sale site. Heavy rains during the winter months, 25 to 30 inches a month, delayed the start of logging until the summer of 1922.

References

Unincorporated communities in Grays Harbor County, Washington
Unincorporated communities in Washington (state)